John Anthony Flynn (September 7, 1883 – March 23, 1935) was a first baseman in Major League Baseball between 1910 and 1912. He attended the College of the Holy Cross and played in the minors until 1921. He also had several stints as a minor league manager from 1917 to 1926.

Raised in South Providence, Rhode Island, his two younger brothers were William S. Flynn, who became Governor of Rhode Island in 1923, and Edmund W. Flynn, who was Chief Justice of the Rhode Island Supreme Court from 1935 to 1957.

References

Sources

Pittsburgh Pirates players
Washington Senators (1901–1960) players
Major League Baseball first basemen
Baseball players from Rhode Island
Providence Friars baseball coaches
1883 births
1935 deaths
Minor league baseball managers
Toronto Maple Leafs (International League) players
Milwaukee Brewers (minor league) players
St. Paul Saints (AA) players
Kansas City Blues (baseball) players
Indianapolis Indians players
Montreal Royals players
Springfield Ponies players
Lawrence Barristers players
New London Planters players
Waterbury Nattatucks players
Springfield Hampdens players